Paola Massarenghi (born August 5, 1565) was an Italian composer. Only one of her works survives, Quando spiega l'insegn'al sommo padre, a spiritual madrigal. It was printed in Arcangelo Gherardini's Primo libro de madrigali a cinque voci. The publication, from Ferrara in 1585, is dedicated to Alfonso Fontanelli, and while other contributors are listed in the dedication, Massarenghi was left out. Massarenghi probably came from a wealthy family, since they were able to get Duke Ranuccio I Farnese to help get a musical education for Massarenghi's younger brother, Giovanni Battista Massarenghi, also a composer.

References
Thomas W. Bridges. "Paola Massarenghi", Grove Music Online, ed. L. Macy (accessed October 22, 2006), grovemusic.com (subscription access).
Thomas W. Bridges, "Paola Massarenghi" The Norton/Grove Dictionary of Women Composers. Edited by Julie Anne Sadie and Rhian Samuel. W.W. Norton and Company, New York, 1995.  
Iain Fenlon. "Arcangelo Gherardini", Grove Music Online, ed. L. Macy (accessed October 22, 2006), grovemusic.com (subscription access).

Notes

Renaissance composers
Italian classical composers
Women classical composers
1565 births
Year of death unknown